Awans is a municipality of Wallonia located in the province of Liège, Belgium. 

On January 1, 2006, Awans had a total population of 8,696. The total area is 27.16 km² which gives a population density of 320 inhabitants per km².

The municipality consists of the following districts: Awans, Fooz, Hognoul, Othée, and Villers-l'Évêque.

See also
 List of protected heritage sites in Awans

References

External links
 

 
Municipalities of Liège Province